The Kosovo men's national under-16 basketball team is a national basketball team of Kosovo, administered by the Kosovo Basketball Federation. It represents the country in international men's under-16 basketball competitions.

FIBA U16 European Championship participations

See also
Kosovo men's national basketball team
Kosovo men's national under-18 basketball team
Kosovo women's national under-16 basketball team

References

External links
Archived records of Kosovo team participations

Basketball in Kosovo
U
Basketball
Men's national under-16 basketball teams